Ocean of Sound is a 1996 compilation album compiled and produced by English musician and author David Toop. The two-disc, cross-licensed "various artists" compilation contains 32 tracks culled from a variety of musical sources, including dub, exotica, free jazz, and field recordings. Toop compiled the recordings to serve as both a historical survey of ambient music and an aural companion to his 1995 book Ocean of Sound: Aether Talk, Ambient Sound and Imaginary Worlds.

Ocean of Sound was released in January 1996 by Virgin Records. It was well received by music critics and finished fourth in the voting for The Village Voices annual Pazz & Jop poll. The album later went out of print.

Background 

In 1995, David Toop published his second book, Ocean of Sound: Aether Talk, Ambient Sound and Imaginary Worlds, which examined music as a medium for deep mental involvement. In the book, Toop said that ambient music can be defined as music listened for relaxation or music that "taps into the disturbing, chaotic undertow of the environment". As an aural companion to the book, Toop curated the compilation album Ocean of Sound, which would also serve as a historical survey of ambient music. The album was released in January 1996 by Virgin Records. It later went out of print, which music journalist Michaelangelos Matos said was because such cross-licensed compilation albums "seldom stay available for very long".

Music 

Ocean of Sound is a two-disc, cross-licensed "various artists" compilation that contains 32 tracks culled from a variety of musical sources, including dub, exotica, free jazz, and field recordings. According to AllMusic's John Bush, all of the songs compiled for the album recapitulate the theme of the book—"that Les Baxter, Aphex Twin, The Beach Boys, Herbie Hancock, King Tubby and My Bloody Valentine are all related by their effect on sound pioneering." In an interview for Perfect Sound Forever, Toop explained why he included free jazz on an album of ambient music, which is commonly thought of as background music:

Toop programmed the recordings for the album so that they would segue into one another. Ocean of Sound begins with songs by Jamaican dub producer King Tubby, American jazz keyboardist Herbie Hancock, and English electronic musician Aphex Twin, respectively, before transitioning to compositions by Claude Debussy, John Cage, the Beach Boys, and Peter Brötzmann, as well as an audio recording of Buddhist monks. Toop programmed the Velvet Underground's 1968 song "I Heard Her Call My Name" so that its muted feedback would segue into an underwater recording of bearded seals barking.

Critical reception 

Reviewing for The Wire in 1996, Peter Shapiro said he was impressed by how Ocean of Sound highlighted musical similarities among its disparate artists, calling it a manifestation of the book's discussion and "a remarkable collection of great music". The Independent wrote that "Toop navigates smoothly between the various strands that have contributed to the current techno/'fourth-world' style of ambient-pop", because he used sources such as Oriental music, minimalism, and classical composers. Michaelangelo Matos from the Chicago Reader viewed it as an idyllic compilation whose songs segued fluently because of Toop's aesthetic, while noting they could also stand alone as interesting, if not excellent, separate pieces: "Ocean of Sound is one of those records that have something to teach even the most jaded music fan about how to listen to music." AllMusic's John Bush recommended the album to any "wide-ranging ambient fan" and said that it illustrates the ideas in Toop's book "beautifully".

Ocean of Sound was voted the fourth best compilation of 1996 in the Pazz & Jop, an annual poll of American critics published by The Village Voice. Robert Christgau, the poll's supervisor, named it the year's best compilation in his own list for the Pazz & Jop. In Christgau's Consumer Guide: Albums of the '90s (2000), he deemed it a "gorgeously segued 32-track tour of trad ambient" with recordings that were smaller representations of larger generational concerns such as disorder and anxiety: "For Toop, it answers a need that's both postmodern and millennial, synthesizing insecurity and hope, 'bliss' and 'non-specific dread.'" In a 2011 list for Spin, Chuck Eddy named Ocean of Sound the most essential album of ambient music, writing that its 32 tracks "flowed into each other like the seven seas".

Track listing

Personnel 
Credits for Ocean of Sound are adapted from AllMusic.

 African Head Charge – performer
 Aphex Twin – performer, producer
 Les Baxter – performer
 The Beach Boys – performer  
 Peter Brötzmann – producer 
 Harold Budd – performer  
 John Cage – performer  
 Denardo Coleman – producer 
 Ornette Coleman – performer  
 Holger Czukay – performer, producer 
 Rolf Dammers – performer  
 Miles Davis – performer  
 Deep Listening Band – performer  
 English Chamber Orchestra – performer  
 Brian Eno – performer, producer 
 Jost Gebers – producer 
 John Hadden – producer 
 Herbie Hancock – performer  
 Jon Hassell – performer  
 Simon Heyworth – mastering 
 Yoshihiro Kawasaki – engineer 
 Andrew Keener – producer 
 King Tubby – performer  
 Makoto Kubota – producer 
 Detty Kurnia – performer  
 Daniel Lanois – producer 
 Bunny Lee – producer 

 Teo Macero – producer 
 Alan Marks – performer, piano  
 Susan Milan – flute 
 Russell Mills – art direction, design 
 Alan Moulder – engineer 
 Music Improvisation Company – performer  
 My Bloody Valentine – performer  
 Sun Ra – performer  
 Terry Riley – performer  
 Jean Rochard – producer 
 Jean C. Roché – producer 
 David Rubinson – producer 
 Paul Schütze – performer, producer 
 Adrian Sherwood – producer 
 Kevin Shields – producer 
 Ujang Suryana – performer  
 Gary L. Todd – producer 
 David Toop – compilation producer, engineer, liner notes, performer  
 Paul Tortelier – conductor 
 Vancouver Soundscape – performer  
 The Velvet Underground – performer  
 Michael Webster – design 
 Thomas Wilbrant – producer 
 Tom Wilson – producer 
 World Soundscape Project – producer 
 John Zorn – performer

See also 
 Virgin Ambient series

References

Further reading

External links 
 

1996 compilation albums
Ambient compilation albums
Virgin Records compilation albums
Albums with cover art by Russell Mills (artist)